The  is an athletic stadium in Urawa-ku, Saitama, Japan. It accommodates 21,500 spectators.

It was formerly known as Saitama Urawa Komaba Stadium (さいたま市駒場スタジアム). Since May 2012, it has been called Urawa Komaba Stadium.

Usage 
The J.League club Urawa Red Diamonds used this stadium for lower-profile home matches from 2005 to 2007. The Reds' local rivals, Omiya Ardija, hosted many of their matches here during the expansion of Ōmiya Park Soccer Stadium.

The stadium is considered the Reds' spiritual home.

Location 
 Address: 1-1-2 Komaba, Urawa-ku, Saitama-shi Saitama 330-0051 JAPAN
 Transport: 20 minutes' walk from JR East Urawa Station and Kita-Urawa Station on Keihin-Tohoku Line

References

External links
 Komaba Sport Park (Saitama City in Japanese)

Sports venues in Saitama (city)
Urawa Red Diamonds
Omiya Ardija
Football venues in Japan
Athletics (track and field) venues in Japan
Sports venues completed in 1967
1967 establishments in Japan